Okere Falls is a small town located 21 km from Rotorua on SH 33 between Rotorua and Tauranga on the North Island of New Zealand. The town is situated on the shore of the Okere Inlet of Lake Rotoiti, from which the Kaituna River flows north towards the Bay of Plenty.

Okere Falls is a popular spot for fishing & rafting and is known for its beautiful lakeside and waterfalls. There are commercial rafting companies and holiday park accommodation within the town. A seven-metre-high waterfall lays claim to being the highest commercially rafted waterfall in the world.

The community at Okere Falls is home to a shop, and a school at Wangamarino.

Demographics
Okere Falls is part of the larger Rotoiti-Rotoehu statistical area.

Okere Falls had a population of 378 at the 2018 New Zealand census, an increase of 63 people (20.0%) since the 2013 census, and an increase of 33 people (9.6%) since the 2006 census. There were 135 households, comprising 177 males and 201 females, giving a sex ratio of 0.88 males per female, with 66 people (17.5%) aged under 15 years, 57 (15.1%) aged 15 to 29, 195 (51.6%) aged 30 to 64, and 60 (15.9%) aged 65 or older.

Ethnicities were 73.0% European/Pākehā, 35.7% Māori, 1.6% Pacific peoples, 5.6% Asian, and 1.6% other ethnicities. People may identify with more than one ethnicity.

Although some people chose not to answer the census's question about religious affiliation, 52.4% had no religion, 38.1% were Christian, 4.0% had Māori religious beliefs and 1.6% had other religions.

Of those at least 15 years old, 90 (28.8%) people had a bachelor's or higher degree, and 36 (11.5%) people had no formal qualifications. 54 people (17.3%) earned over $70,000 compared to 17.2% nationally. The employment status of those at least 15 was that 162 (51.9%) people were employed full-time, 39 (12.5%) were part-time, and 18 (5.8%) were unemployed.

Rotoiti-Rotoehu statistical area

Rotoiti-Rotoehu had a population of 1,965 at the 2018 New Zealand census, an increase of 306 people (18.4%) since the 2013 census, and an increase of 30 people (1.6%) since the 2006 census. There were 660 households, comprising 999 males and 966 females, giving a sex ratio of 1.03 males per female. The median age was 43.5 years (compared with 37.4 years nationally), with 381 people (19.4%) aged under 15 years, 327 (16.6%) aged 15 to 29, 921 (46.9%) aged 30 to 64, and 339 (17.3%) aged 65 or older.

Ethnicities were 57.1% European/Pākehā, 55.6% Māori, 3.5% Pacific peoples, 3.2% Asian, and 1.4% other ethnicities. People may identify with more than one ethnicity.

The percentage of people born overseas was 11.8, compared with 27.1% nationally.

Although some people chose not to answer the census's question about religious affiliation, 46.7% had no religion, 37.7% were Christian, 5.5% had Māori religious beliefs, 0.3% were Hindu, 0.2% were Muslim, 0.5% were Buddhist and 2.6% had other religions.

Of those at least 15 years old, 309 (19.5%) people had a bachelor's or higher degree, and 264 (16.7%) people had no formal qualifications. The median income was $28,700, compared with $31,800 nationally. 201 people (12.7%) earned over $70,000 compared to 17.2% nationally. The employment status of those at least 15 was that 723 (45.6%) people were employed full-time, 237 (15.0%) were part-time, and 111 (7.0%) were unemployed.

History and culture 

The area is the traditional homeland of the Ngāti Pikiao, who remain the guardians of the river through the Lake Rotoiti Scenic Reserves Board.  Their traditional name for the Kaituna River was Okere River.  The river's alternative name, 'Kaituna', refers to its significance as a food source, in particular eels.

Before the first road bridge over the river was built in 1872, local Māori operated a ferry across the inlet. Travellers from Tauranga to Rotorua would typically break their journey with a night at the nearby Fraser's Hotel.

The first 11 km stretch of the Kaituna River is still commonly referred to as Okere River, and is a site of significant Māori cultural and spiritual values. Okere River means "the place of drifting".

Marae

The area has three Ngāti Pikiao marae.

Pounamunui Marae and its Houmaitawhiti meeting house are affiliated with Ngāti Hinekura. Tāheke Opatia Marae and Rangitihi meeting house are affiliated with Ngāti Hinerangi. In October 2020, the Government committed $4,525,104 from the Provincial Growth Fund to upgrade Pounamunui, Tāheke Opatia and eight other marae, creating an estimated 34 jobs.

Te Takinga Marae and Te Takinga meeting house are affiliated with Ngāti Te Takinga. In October 2020, the Government committed $441,758 from the Provincial Growth Fund to upgrade the marae, creating an estimated 51 jobs.

Education

Economy 

The Okere Falls area has drawn visitors for well over 100 years, with the area being a popular day trip destination from Rotorua.  By the late 19th century, trout fishing had become very popular, and for a while the hydro-electric power station was a tourist attraction in its own right.

A well-formed bushwalk with scenic lookouts over Okere River and its spectacular waterfalls, the Okere Falls and the Tutea Falls, as well as the remains of the hydro-electric power station, can be found on Trout Pool Road. There are car parks and toilets at both ends of the 30 minute walk, which starts at Okere Falls, passes Tutea Falls about halfway, and finishes at Trout Pool Falls.

At Tutea Falls, named after a local Māori chief, a lookout provides a good vantage point to see kayakers and rafts plunge over the seven-metre-tall waterfall. From the viewing platform, steps lead down to the river and Tutea's Caves.  These steps were cut into the cliff face in 1907 as an attraction for early tourists, who would have their photo taken at the bottom of the steps.
The trout pool at the northern end of the track is a popular trout fishing spot.

The Okere Falls stretch of the Kaituna River is popular with whitewater rafters and kayakers, and is classified as grade 3/4, with Tutea Falls being a solid grade 4.

Okere is also home to the Okere Falls Power Station.

In popular culture 

In the fifth season of the CBS television series The Amazing Race, Okere Falls were the site of one of two Detour options, 'Clean or Dirty', with teams that chose 'Clean' got the chance to go whitewater river sledging at the falls.

For the second series of Jack Osbourne: Adrenaline Junkie, Jack Osbourne tries whitewater kayaking at the falls as a part of the show's challenge before making his way to Japan.

References 

Rotorua Lakes District
Populated places in the Bay of Plenty Region
Populated lakeshore places in New Zealand